The Return: Life After ISIS is an 2021 British-Spanish documentary film directed and produced by Alba Sotorra. It follows Shamima Begum and Hoda Muthana as they leave ISIS and attempt to return to their countries.

It had its world premiere at South by Southwest on 17 March 2021. It was released in the United Kingdom on 15 June 2021, by Sky Documentaries.

Synopsis
Shamima Begum, Hoda Muthana, Kimberly Gwen Polman, among other women leave ISIS and attempt to return their home countries.

Production
In February 2021, it was announced Alba Sotorra had directed the film, with Sky Documentaries set to distribute in the United Kingdom.

Release
The film had its world premiere at South by Southwest on 17 March 2021. It also screened at the Hot Docs International Film Festival on 29 April 2021. It was released in the United Kingdom on 15 June 2021.

Reception
Variety said, "These stories are harrowing, but the manner in which they’re revealed is gently optimistic, a testament to the patience and efficacy of Sevinaz, the energetic activist who runs workshops that encourage the women to confront the past and find solidarity in one another."

POV Magazine said, "speaks to generations affected by these conflicts and leaves us both informed and no less certain about what the just solution to the situation of these survivors should be."

References

2021 films
2021 documentary films
British documentary films
Spanish documentary films
2020s English-language films
2020s British films